Barbara M. Leonard (née Martin; June 12, 1924 – January 24, 2013) was an American Republican politician. She was born in Newport in 1924.

She was a candidate for the United States Senate in 1984 as a Republican, but lost to incumbent Claiborne Pell. She served as the Secretary of State of Rhode Island from 1993-95 as a Republican. Leonard served on several state boards and commissions, including the Rhode Island Economic Development Corporation, the state's Port Authority and the state Advisory Committee on Refugee Resettlement.

Death
Leonard died on January 24, 2013, aged 88.

References

|-

1924 births
2013 deaths
Politicians from Newport, Rhode Island
Brown University alumni
Rhode Island Republicans
Secretaries of State of Rhode Island
Women in Rhode Island politics
Candidates in the 1984 United States elections
20th-century American politicians
20th-century American women politicians
21st-century American women